The One Hundred Fifteenth Ohio General Assembly was the legislative body of the state of Ohio in 1983 and 1984. In this General Assembly, both the Ohio Senate and the Ohio House of Representatives were controlled by the Democratic Party.  In the Senate, there were 17 Democrats and 16 Republicans. In the House, there were 62 Democrats and 37 Republicans.  It was the first General Assembly to use redistricted legislative districts from the 1980 United States Census.

Major events

Vacancies
December 2, 1983: Senator Sam Speck (R-20th) resigns. 
March 11, 1983: Representative Pete Crossland (D-42nd) resigns. 
July 19, 1983: Representative Arthur Wilkowski (D-46th) resigns. 
March 6, 1984: Senator Tom Fries (D-6th) resigns
May 17, 1984: Senator Morris Jackson (D-21st) resigns. 
May 20, 1984: Senator Ben Skall (R-22nd) resigns. 
May 22, 1984: Representative Jim Petro (R-6th) resigns.

Appointments
March 16, 1983: Vernon Sykes is appointed to the 42nd House District. 
November 30, 1983: Don Czarcinski is appointed to the 46th House District. 
January 10, 1984: Bob Ney is appointed to the 20th Senatorial District. 
March 6, 1984: Tom Talbott is appointed to the 6th Senatorial District. 
May 17, 1984: Michael R. White is appointed to the 21st Senatorial District. 
May 20, 1984: Grace L. Drake is appointed to the 22nd Senatorial District.  
May 23, 1984: Jeff Jacobs is appointed to the 6th House District.

Senate

Leadership

Majority leadership
 President of the Senate: Harry Meshel
 President pro tempore of the Senate: Neal Zimmers
 Assistant pro tempore: Charles Butts
 Whip: Marigene Valiquette

Minority leadership
 Leader: Paul Gillmor
 Assistant Leader: Stanley Aronoff
 Whip: Sam Speck
 Assistant Whip: Paul Pfeifer

Members of the 115th Ohio Senate

House of Representatives

Leadership

Majority leadership
 Speaker of the House: Vern Riffe
 President pro tempore of the Senate: Barney Quilter
 Floor Leader: Bill Mallory
 Assistant Majority Floor Leader: Vernon Cook
 Majority Whip: Mary Boyle

Minority leadership
 Leader: Corwin Nixon
 Assistant Leader: Waldo Rose
 Whip: Dave Johnson

Members of the 115th Ohio House of Representatives

Appt.- Member was appointed to current House Seat

See also
Ohio House of Representatives membership, 126th General Assembly
Ohio House of Representatives membership, 125th General Assembly
 List of Ohio state legislatures

References
Ohio House of Representatives official website
Project Vote Smart – State House of Ohio
Map of Ohio House Districts
Ohio District Maps 2002–2012
2006 election results from Ohio Secretary of State

Ohio legislative sessions
Ohio
Ohio
1983 in Ohio
1984 in Ohio
de:Repräsentantenhaus von Ohio